Kenneth McFaul (born 1948) is a politician from Northern Ireland.

McFaul was a member of the Protestant Unionist Party and a founder of their successor group the Democratic Unionist Party (DUP). He represented the party as a member of the Northern Ireland Constitutional Convention for East Antrim and was a member of Carrickfergus Borough Council from 1973 to 1985, serving as Mayor from 1981 to 1983. He was an unsuccessful candidate in the 1982 Northern Ireland Assembly election. He left the DUP in 1984 after missing out to Jim Allister in the race to be the party's general election candidate for East Antrim the previous year.

McFaul would later return to politics with the Traditional Unionist Voice, and was a candidate for the party in the 2014 election to the newly established Mid and East Antrim District Council. He was not elected to the body.

References

1948 births
Living people
Members of the Northern Ireland Constitutional Convention
Democratic Unionist Party councillors
Traditional Unionist Voice politicians
Members of Carrickfergus Borough Council
Mayors of places in Northern Ireland